Jamillah James (b. 1980) is an American curator. She is the Manilow Senior Curator at the Museum of Contemporary Art Chicago.

Early life and education 
James grew up in New Jersey. Her mother was a musician. James's early interest in music and film provided one way into the world of visual art. James attended Columbia College Chicago, where she was in the first class to study art history. She graduated in 2005. While in Chicago for college, James founded a DIY, live/work experimental music venue called Pink Section and later lived at the exhibition space Archer Ballroom, where she organized live music performances.

Career 
Before moving to Los Angeles, James was an independent curator and held curatorial fellowships at the Studio Museum in Harlem (2012-2014) and the Queens Museum (2010).

James was Assistant Curator at the Hammer Museum. At the Hammer Museum she organized shows by Alex Da Corte, Simone Leigh, and Charles Gaines. She also curated Njideka Akunyili Crosby's first solo exhibition, and would later present Crosby at Art + Practice, a space founded by artist Mark Bradford.

In 2016 James was named curator at the Institute of Contemporary Art, Los Angeles. Upon her arrival she noted her plans to present a mixture of Los Angeles artists and international artists, and later described her goal of harnessing creative energy as a path to address a "turbulent political climate". In 2018 she spoke with The Los Angeles Times about "de-centering" whiteness in the art world. While in Los Angeles James curated exhibitions with artists Sarah Cain, Harold Mendez, Nayland Blake, B. Wurtz, and Nina Chanel Abney. James' 2019 exhibit for Blake was described as a "thrilling iteration of the artist's thoughts...".

In 2018 James and Margot Norton were announced as curators of the New Museum's 2021 Triennial.

In 2021 she was named Manilow Senior Curator at the Museum of Contemporary Art Chicago, and began her role in early 2022.

Awards and honors 
In 2018, James received a fellowship from the VIA Art Foundation. In 2021, James was awarded the Ellsworth Kelly Award from the Foundation for Contemporary Arts.; the Noah Davis Prize from the Underground Museum; and a curatorial fellowship from the Andy Warhol Foundation for the Visual Arts.

References 

Living people
American curators
American women curators
Columbia College Chicago alumni
Year of birth missing (living people)